{{DISPLAYTITLE:C21H32O2}}
The molecular formula C21H32O2 (molar mass: 316.47 g/mol, exact mass: 316.24023) may refer to:

 Bolasterone
 Calusterone
 Cannabigerol
 Cyclopregnol
 8,9-Dihydrocannabidiol
 Dihydroprogesterones
 3α-Dihydroprogesterone
 3β-Dihydroprogesterone
 5α-Dihydroprogesterone
 5β-Dihydroprogesterone
 20α-Dihydroprogesterone
 20β-Dihydroprogesterone
 Ethyltestosterone
 Ethynylandrostanediol
 17α-Ethynyl-3α-androstanediol (a synthetic androstane steroid)
 17α-Ethynyl-3β-androstanediol (a synthetic estrogen steroid)
 Methylstenbolone
 Norbolethone, an anabolic steroid
 Pregnenolone